(JCTV) is a Japanese television production company, established in October 1971. Its major shareholders are TV Asahi Holdings and Tokyu Agency. It also distributes CNN channels to Japan, available on SKY PerfecTV! and other providers.

TV channels
 CNNj HD: Mix of CNN International and CNN/US
 CNN/US HD: Relays HD feed of CNN/US

External links
 
 Profile in English

Television production companies of Japan
TV Asahi
Asahi Shimbun Company
Tokyu Group
Mass media companies established in 1971
Japanese companies established in 1971